The following lists events that happened in 1930 in Iceland.

Incumbents
Monarch - Kristján X
Prime Minister – Tryggvi Þórhallsson

Events

Births

22 March – Eythor Thorlaksson, guitarist and composer (d. 2018)
15 April – Vigdís Finnbogadóttir, politician.
26 May – Ragnhildur Helgadóttir, politician (d. 2016).
25 August – Baldur Ragnarsson, poet (d. 2018)

Deaths

References

 
1930s in Iceland
Iceland
Iceland
Years of the 20th century in Iceland